is a Japanese manga series written and illustrated by Robinson Haruhara. It was adapted into an anime television series in 2013. A second season was announced for the summer of 2013.

Plot
A millenium ago, the Demon King wreaked havoc in the human realm, but was sealed by the legendary Hero Creasion. Closer to the story's present, a large hole appeared in the world, from which a large number of demons emerged. The King has ordered the 75 probable descendants of the original hero to destroy the demons and save the world. Senyu follows the story of Alba, hero number 45, and his quest to save the world. Along the way, he is accompanied by Royal Soldier Ross, whose somewhat sadistic, antagonistic antics serve as comic relief. Alba quickly teams up with the demon queen herself, who is soon revealed to be a naive, young pink-haired girl who accidentally instigated the demon crisis while making popcorn. The narrative places significant emphasis on plot twists, adding to the eccentricity of the manga and anime. 
 
The series starts almost exclusively comedic, with episodic gags mainly involving Alba's bad luck and Ross's abuses. A more serialized story develops halfway into Volume 1, as an order of twelve powerful demons themed after the twelve months of the Gregorian Calendar starts attempting to revive the original Demon King. Simultaneously, other probable hero descendants also interfere, with lesser demons and government officials caught in the crossfire.

The world's past and Creasion's origins are explored in the second volume, culminating in the supposed defeat of the story's main antagonist, the first Demon King. The third volume focuses on the remnants of the twelve demons, especially the strange machinations of one of them, Elf November. The fourth volume explores Elf's past and his complex involvement with existence, concluding Senyu's main storyline. 

Volume 5 serves as an epilogue, elaborating upon the original story and later shifting to a comedic slice of life where the characters adapt to the world after the chaos wrought by the catastrophic events explicated in the past volumes. The later portion of Volume 5 starts a new serialized storyline, re-exploring some aspects of Elf's past and introducing a new group of antagonists.

Characters

Alba serves as the main character in the first two volumes, though he takes a smaller—albeit significant—role as a side character in volumes 3 and 5. Alba is the 45th hero sent out by the King to stop the Demon Lord and travels around with the soldier Ross. Ross usually physically and verbally abuses him, as Alba often acts as the straight man in tsukkomi comedic routines.

Ross is the soldier that was sent out with the 45th hero Alba to stop the Demon Lord. He often physically abuses Alba for comedic purposes and the two usually engage in tsukkomi. He possesses extensive knowledge on the nature of the demon crisis—much of which is unknown to his acquaintances—and is one of the most important characters during the whole manga's run.

Ruki is the Third Demon Lord. She is several hundred years old, but only became the new Demon Lord ten years ago and therefore identifies as a ten-year-old. While trying to make popcorn, she accidentally released all the monsters onto the human world and is currently traveling around to bring back the twelve great demons.

The 23rd hero sent out by the King to stop the Demon Lord. He is initially antagonistic towards the trio, but later proves to be a noble and useful ally. In later chapters, he becomes the head butler of the King's castle, and in volume 3, the first-year teacher of the Hero Academy.

One of the twelve demons that Ruki is searching for. Janua has super strength and is obsessed with ninjas, basing his moves and mannerisms around them. Carefree and childish, he is close friends with the comically hypermasculine Samejima, a lower-ranking demon. Janua is not very loyal to the twelve demons and befriends and becomes an ally with the trio roughly halfway through Volume 1. He possesses unique teletransportation abilities with next to no limitations, which makes him key in the plan of the twelve to revive the Demon King.

One of the twelve demons that Ruki is searching for. The de facto leader of the 12 demons, he is a fanatic set out to revive the Demon King. To do this, he brought together the 12 demons, each of whom has an ability necessary for his plan (or direct firepower). He serves as the main antagonist of Volume 1 and early into volume 2, and a supporting one in 3.

Another one of the twelve demons that Ruki is searching for. He is mischievous and his motivations are by far the most ambiguous in the series, both helping the heroes and backstabbing them and the other demons on a whim. Later revealed to be immensely powerful and deeply related to the world's past, he is implied to be responsible for most of the events in Senyu's narrative. He serves as a supporting antagonist in Volumes 1 and 2, later becoming the main villain in Volume 3 and the protagonist in Volume 4.

Media

Manga
Senyuu is a web manga, serialized in the Japanese video sharing website Niconico, its name is a portmanteau of Senshi Yuusha which translates to Soldier Hero. It received a printed remake of its first and second volumes titled Senyuu. Main Quest - Dai Isshou and Senyuu. Main Quest - Dai Nishou, in addition to spinoffs, such as Senyuu. JUMP SQUARE (Senyuu SQ), a manga set in a parallel alternate universe, and one-shots, such as Senyuu. - Alba・Ross-hen Minato Machi no Eiyuu included in the BD release, and Senyuu. - Foyfoy・Rudolf-hen Mogura to Oashisu a doujinshi released by the author. Both one-shots serve as prequels to the main storyline, following the stories of how Alba met Ross and how Foyfoy met Rudolf, another major character.

Anime
An anime television series directed by Yutaka Yamamoto and produced by Liden Films and Ordet aired between January 8 and April 2, 2013.

Episode list

See also
'Tis Time for "Torture," Princess — Another manga series written by Robinson Haruhara.

References

External links
Official anime website 

2010 manga
2013 anime television series debuts
Anime series based on manga
Japanese webcomics
Kodansha manga
Liden Films
Ordet (studio)
Shueisha franchises
Shueisha manga
Shōnen manga
TV Tokyo original programming
Webcomics in print
Fantasy anime and manga